Rupert and the Frog Song is a 1984 animated short film based on the comic strip character Rupert Bear, written and produced by Paul McCartney and directed by Geoff Dunbar. The making of Rupert and the Frog Song began in 1981 and ended in 1983. The film was released theatrically as an accompaniment to McCartney's film Give My Regards to Broad Street. The song "We All Stand Together" from the film's soundtrack reached No. 3 when released in the UK Singles Chart. It was released in 2004 as one of the segments of Paul McCartney: Music & Animation.

Plot
Rupert Bear decides to head off for a walk on the hills. With his Mother's blessing, he sets off for a jolly trip, encountering his friends Edward Elephant and Bill Badger along the way, who are too busy to join him; Bill needs to look after his baby brother and Edward has to do some shopping. As Rupert reaches a hill, he props himself up against the trunk of an oak tree and enjoys the glory of the countryside. Suddenly, he finds himself enveloped by a rainbow cloud of butterflies previously masquerading as leaves on the oak tree, and all of them swarm away from the leafless tree towards a rocky outcrop; Rupert cannot resist following them. As he leaves, a large white barn owl and two black cats decide to follow him.

Upon the rocks, Rupert finds a large number of multicolored frogs. He walks into a cave behind a waterfall and sees three signs: "Frogs only beyond this point", "Everything except frogs must be kept on a lead", and "Guard frogs operating". He sneaks into the palace, trying to avoid getting caught by the frog guards. There, he witnesses the Frog Song, an event that occurs only once in a few hundred years in which various frogs of all shapes and sizes come together and sing "We All Stand Together". Around the end, the frog King and Queen rise out of the water before the crowd to finish off the song. After a thunderous applause from the frogs, the owl, who had followed Rupert to find out where the frogs were hiding, launches itself for an attack on the royals, but Rupert manages to warn the frogs in time and they all quickly retreat, leaving the owl and the cats empty-handed and the palace completely empty. After hearing his mother call him, Rupert excitedly rushes home to tell his family about what he saw.

Cast
 Paul McCartney (voice) – Rupert, Edward, Bill, Boy Frog
 June Whitfield (voice) – Rupert's Mother
 Windsor Davies (voice) – Rupert's Father, Father Frog

Release
McCartney had been planning his Rupert movie since at least the early 1970s, when his company, McCartney Productions Ltd., acquired the rights to the film the day after the Beatles' break-up. At one point, the song "Little Lamb Dragonfly," which was recorded in 1971 and released on the 1973 album Red Rose Speedway, was intended for the film.

The video, distributed by Virgin Video, was released simultaneously with the single "We All Stand Together" and became the biggest-selling video of 1985, as well as being nominated for the 'Best Music Video – Short Form' at the Grammy Awards in 1986. The video also included two other shorts with music by Linda McCartney: "Seaside Woman" (a song credited to Suzy and the Red Stripes) and "The Oriental Nightfish".

In September 2004, the film was re-released on DVD Tales of Wonder Music and Animation Classics (also called Paul McCartney – Music & Animation Collection), to mark its 20th Anniversary, along with two other shorts directed by Geoff Dunbar, Tropic Island Hum and Tuesday. This version contains an alternative opening, which begins in an old bedroom filled with Rupert merchandise. We see Paul McCartney opening a large chest and digging through old dusty books until he comes upon an old Rupert book. He takes it out of the chest, blows on it, and dust flies away from the book (sparkling dust in the 2004 DVD). McCartney opens the book to reveal his childhood house address, a possible reference to the VHS covers of this film. The page then turns to the title card. The print of this version is also matted, cropping the top and bottom of the image to an aspect ratio of 1.85:1 widescreen, which was how the film was exhibited theatrically. The opening for this edition was previously used at the start of a music video for the song "We All Stand Together".

In October 2020, McCartney announced a 4K restoration of the film, alongside a re-release of the picture disc single, to celebrate the 100th anniversary of the Rupert character.

Awards and nominations
In 1984, the year of its release, it won a UK BAFTA (British Academy Award) for Best Animated Short Film.

References

External links

Official Website

1984 animated films
1984 films
British animated short films
Animated films about bears
Films based on comic strips
Rupert Bear
Films about frogs
1980s English-language films
1980s British films